Harvard Library is the network of Harvard University's libraries and services. It is the oldest library system in the United States and both the largest academic library and largest private library in the world. Its collection holds over 20 million volumes, 400 million manuscripts, 10 million photographs, and one million maps.

Harvard Library holds the third largest collection of all libraries in the nation after the Library of Congress and Boston Public Library. Based on the number of items held, it is the fifth largest library in the United States. Harvard Library is a member of the Research Collections and Preservation Consortium (ReCAP); other members include Columbia University Libraries, Princeton University Library, New York Public Library, and Ivy Plus Libraries Confederation, making over 90 million books available to the library's users.   

The library is open to current Harvard affiliates, and some events and spaces are open to the public. The largest and most recognized building in the Harvard Library system is Widener Library in Harvard Yard.

History
Harvard's library system grew primarily from personal donations, including from John Harvard and John Hull. John Harvard was a Puritan minister who accumulated 400 books spreading word of his faith.  These volumes were left to Harvard, initiating the library's collection.   The works in this collection soon became obsolete, as Harvard Library quickly changed to an academic institute and found little need for the theological titles.

Until 1676, the library was based in Old College building. That year, it moved to Harvard Hall, where it remained until 1764 when the building and the library's entire collection was destroyed in a fire. The collection had 5,000 titles and was the largest collection in British America before the fire. By 1764 it was the largest library in British America, with 5,000 volumes, but disaster struck that year when the library was destroyed by fire.  A new Harvard Hall was built, and 15,000 books were collected to create the new library. After the fire, readers in the library were not allowed candles or lamps and if there was a fire burning in the hearth, a librarian or assistant had to be present.  Patrons were allowed to borrow and return up to three books at a time on Friday mornings and were allowed to keep them for up to six weeks. Thomas Hollis V, great-nephew of one of the university's early benefactors, began shipping thousands of specially chosen volumes to the library. Hollis continued to send books regularly until his death in 1774, and he bequeathed £500 for the university to continue acquiring books. This became Harvard's first endowed book fund, and the fund has grown annually since. Harvard Library's online catalog, HOLLIS, a bacronym for "Harvard On-Line Library Information System", is named after him.

In 1841, with space limited in Harvard Hall, the library was moved to Gore Hall in 1841. In 1912, the library moved again after Gore Hall became unsuitable, and the library was moved into multiple buildings with some of the buildings representing specialized topics.

Some books were digitized in Google Books under the management of former Harvard Library director Sidney Verba.

In August 2012, based in part on recommendations from the Task Force on University Libraries and the Library Implementation Working Group, Harvard Library began working to coordinate and encourage collaboration among Harvard's 73 libraries.

Holdings 
Harvard Library  houses a range of historical artifacts and primary documents from around the world, including one of only 23 complete Gutenberg Bibles. The largest collection of East Asian-language material outside of East Asia is held in the Harvard–Yenching Library.  

The largest collection of archives focused on business and economic history is housed in Baker Library/Bloomberg Center at Harvard Business School. Botany Libraries’ archives include Henry David Thoreau’s personal herbaria, letters from Charles Darwin to Asa Gray, and thousands of botanical illustrations. The Wolbach Library holds the oldest surviving images of the moon, and the Tozzer Library is one of the oldest anthropological libraries in the world.   

Harvard Library also has a robust collection of digital content. More than 6 million digital objects are accessible online by anyone, regardless of whether or not they're affiliated with Harvard, via the Harvard Digital Collections page.

The CURIOSity tool offers another way to explore Harvard's digital collections, providing curated views, specialized search options and discovery of unique content. Curated collections include the Colonial North America archive, the Islamic Heritage Project, and over 3,5000 digitized daguerreotypes.

Publications
By 1973, Harvard Library had authored or published over 430 volumes in print in addition to nine periodicals and seven annual publications. Among these is a monthly newsletter, The Harvard Librarian and a quarterly journal, Harvard Library Bulletin, which was established in 1947, dormant from 1960 until 1967, and published regularly since. The Bulletin is published three times a year in spring, summer, and fall. Harvard Library Bulletin is available to the public under subscription and an archive of past issues is available on Harvard Library website.

Organizational structure
Harvard Library is the formal name for an administrative entity within the central administration that oversees the development and implementation of strategies that facilitate access to research, collections, services, and space in ways that raise the value of the university's investment in its libraries., Martha Whitehead is the current vice president for Harvard Library and the Roy E. Larsen Librarian of the Faculty of Arts and Sciences. The Harvard Library holds or offers:

Access Services connects the academic community to the vast array of library resources.
Information and Technical Services is responsible for acquiring, licensing and providing access to tangible and online collections in all formats.
Preservation, Conservation and Digital Imaging Services is committed to ensuring that library materials remain secure and usable for contemporary and future scholars by conserving materials, digitizing collections, preserving library content in digital formats and providing robust education and outreach programs.
Harvard University Archives is the university's institutional archives.  It oversees the university's permanent records, collects Harvard-related manuscripts, papers, and historical materials, and supervises records management across the university.
Finance supports the library by providing accurate information that assists decision-making, maintaining the integrity of finance systems and completing financial transactions.
Program Management ensures that potential projects and approved projects are managed in a considered, predictable and transparent way.
The Office for Scholarly Communication provides for open access to works of scholarship produced by the Harvard community.

Governance

Library Visiting Committee
Visiting Committee members are experts and Harvard alumni who are appointed by the corporation. The committee oversees the strategy and administration of Harvard Library on behalf of the Overseers. Bi-annual visits and regular updates by the Office of the Provost provide an opportunity for Visiting Committee members to understand and advise on the Harvard Library's progress.

Library Board
The Library Board is charged with reviewing strategic plans of the Harvard Library and assessing its progress in meeting those plans, reviewing system-wide policies and standards and overseeing progress of the central services. The provost chairs the Library Board (established in December 2010) and the Office of the Provost is responsible for overseeing the Harvard Library. The Harvard Library Board is composed of six permanent members and five rotating members who serve three years each, with their initial terms staggered. The permanent members include the provost, the Carl H. Pforzheimer University Professor, and the deans or designees from the Faculty of Arts and Sciences, Harvard Business School, Harvard Law School, and Harvard Medical School.

Rotating members include three at-large, tenured faculty members, as well as deans or designees from Harvard Kennedy School, Harvard Graduate School of Design, Harvard Divinity School, Harvard Graduate School of Education, Harvard School of Public Health, Harvard School of Engineering and Applied Sciences, and Radcliffe Institute.

Faculty Advisory Committee
In 2011, the Harvard Library Faculty Advisory Council was established to advise the university. Robert Darnton, Pforzheimer Professor, is chair, and James Engell, Gurney Professor of English Literature, is vice-chair the advisory committee.

Library Council on Student Experience
Established in 2012, the Library Council on Student Experience  is a joint council consisting of librarians and students from across the university who identify and work together on University-wide priorities identified by the council for improving the student library experience. The council is co-chaired by a librarian appointed by the vice president for Harvard Library and by a student elected from student council members. Students and librarians are nominated by the university's library directors and selected by the Office of the Provost. Other members include representatives from the Tell Us project, the Berkman Institute, and Harvard Library Shared Services. Terms are for two academic years. The Council makes recommendations to and is supported by the vice president for Harvard Library.

Library Leadership Team
Harvard Library Leadership Team is responsible for planning, prioritizing and implementing joint library initiatives. The team works with the vice president for the Harvard Library to develop and implement library-wide strategy and policy approved by the Board in collaboration with other standing committees and working groups. Chaired by the vice president for Harvard Library, the team includes members of the library's senior management team, library directors from the ten professional schools and the Radcliffe Institute, the managing director of Library Technology Services (HUIT), Harvard Library shared services heads, and Harvard Library's director of communications and its director of diversity, equity, and inclusion.

Harvard libraries
Along with shared services such as circulation, cataloging, and preservation, the following libraries make up Harvard Library: 

 Arnold Arboretum's Horticultural Library
 Baker Library/Bloomberg Center at Harvard Business School
 Biblioteca Berenson in Florence, Italy
 Botany Libraries
 Cabot Science Library 
 Countway Library at Harvard Medical School and Harvard T.H. Chan School of Public Health
 Dumbarton Oaks Research Library in Washington, D.C.
 Ernst Mayr Library at the Museum of Comparative Zoology 
 Fine Arts Library
 Fung Library
 Gutman Library at Harvard Graduate School of Education 
 Harvard Divinity School Library
 Harvard Film Archive
 Harvard Kennedy School Library & Knowledge Services
 Harvard Law School Library
Harvard Map Collection
 Harvard University Archives
 Harvard-Yenching Library
 Houghton Library
 Lamont Library
 Loeb Music Library
 Loeb Design Library (Harvard Graduate School of Design)
 Robbins Library of Philosophy
 Schlesinger Library on the History of Women in America (Radcliffe Institute)
 Tozzer Library
 Widener Library
 Wolbach Library

Librarians

17th century
 Solomon Stoddard, 1667–1672
 Samuel Sewall, 1674
 Daniel Gookin, 1674–1676, 1679–1681
 Daniel Allin, 1676–1679
 John Cotton, 1681–1690
 Henry Newman, 1690–1693
 Ebenezer Pemberton, 1693–1697
 Nathaniel Saltonstall, 1697–1701
18th century
 Anthony Stoddard, 1701–1702
 Josiah Willard, 1702–1703
 John Whiting, 1703–1706
 John Gore, 1706–1707
 Nathaniel Gookin, 1707–1709
 Edward Holyoke, 1709–1712
 Thomas Robie, 1712–1713
 John Denison, 1713–1714
 John Rogers, 1714–1718
 William Welsteed, 1718–1720
 William Cooke, 1720–1721
 Joshua Gee, 1721–1722
 Mitchell Sewall, 1722–1723
 John Hancock, 1723–1726
 Stephen Sewall, 1726–1728
 Joseph Champney, 1728–1729
 Joseph Pynchon, 1729–1730
 Henry Gibbs, 1730–1734

 Samuel Coolidge, 1734–1735
 James Diman, 1735–1737
 Samuel Cooke, 1737
 Thomas Marsh, 1737–1741
 Belcher Hancock, 1741–1742
 Benjamin Prat, 1742–1743
 Matthew Cushing, 1743–1748
 Oliver Peabody, 1748–1750
 Stephen Badger, 1751–1753
 John Rand, 1753–1755
 Mather Byles, 1755–1757
 Elizur Holyoke, 1757–1758
 Edward Brooks, 1758–1760
 Samuel Deane, 1760–1762
 Stephen Sewall, 1762–1763
 Andrew Eliot, 1763–1767
 Jonathan Moore, 1767–1768
 Nathaniel Ward, 1768
 Caleb Prentice, 1768–1769
 William Mayhew, 1769–1772
 James Winthrop, 1772–1787
 Isaac Smith, 1787–1791
 Thaddeus Mason Harris, 1787, 1791–1793
 Samuel Shapleigh, 1793–1800
19th century
 Sidney Willard, 1800–1805
 Peter Nourse, 1805–1808
 Samuel Cooper Thacher, 1808–1811

 John Lovejoy Abbot, 1811–1813
 Andrews Norton, 1813–1821
 Joseph Green Cogswell, 1821–1823
 Charles Folsom, 1823–1826
 Benjamin Peirce, 1826–1831
 Thaddeus William Harris, 1831–1856
 John Langdon Sibley, 1856–1877
 Justin Winsor, 1877–1897
 William Coolidge Lane, 1898–1910
20th century
 Archibald Cary Coolidge, 1910–1928
 Robert Pierpont Blake, 1928–1937
 Keyes Metcalf, 1937–1955
 Paul Herman Buck, 1955–1964
 Merle Fainsod, 1964–1972
 Douglas W. Bryant, 1964–1979 (University Librarian, 1964–1979; Director of the University Library, 1972–1979)
 Louis E. Martin, 1972–1979 (Librarian of Harvard College)
 Oscar Handlin, 1972–1984, (Carl Pforzheimer University Professor, 1972-; Director of the University Library, 1979–1984)
 Sidney Verba, 1984–2006

21st century
 Robert Darnton, 2007–2015 (Carl H. Pforzheimer University Professor and University Librarian)
 Sarah Thomas, 2013–2018 (Vice President for the Harvard Library and University Librarian, Roy E. Larsen Librarian for the Faculty of Arts and Sciences)
 Martha Whitehead, 2019–Present (Harvard Library vice president and university Librarian, Roy E. Larsen Librarian for the Faculty of Arts and Sciences)

See also
 Google Books Library Project
 Dataverse
 Boston Medical Library 
 JHOVE
 List of online image archives

References
https://archive.org/stream/archaeologiaame03amer#page/n263/mode/2up

Further reading
 "History of the Library." In The Library of Harvard University: Descriptive and Historical Notes, 4th ed., 12–35. Cambridge: Harvard University Press, 1934.
 Carpenter, Kenneth E. The First 350 Years of the Harvard University Library: Description of an Exhibition. Cambridge: Harvard University Press, 1986.
 Bond, W. H. and Hugh Amory, eds. The Printed Catalogues of the Harvard College Library, 1723–1790. Boston: The Colonial Society of Massachusetts, 1996.
 Kraus, J. W. (1961). The Harvard Undergraduate Library of 1773. College & Research Libraries, 22(4), 247–252.
 Olsen, M., & Harvey, L. G. (1993). Reading in revolutionary times: book borrowing from the Harvard College Library, 1773–1782. Harvard Library Bulletin, 4, 57–72.

External links

HOLLIS catalog
Journal of Library History, vol. 22, no. 3 (Summer 1987): 338-341.
Harvard College Library: Library charging records, 1762-1897
Early Catalogs and Shelflists of the Harvard College Library, 1723-1822: an inventory

 
University and college academic libraries in the United States
Harvard University buildings
Libraries in Massachusetts
1638 establishments in Massachusetts
Libraries in Middlesex County, Massachusetts
Libraries established in 1638